Albert Toris (17 July 1925 – 20 March 2022) was a French football player, born in Lille (Nord), and who died in Morsang-sur-Orge (Essonne).

A centre-back, he spent his career in France. He started at Troyes then at Monaco, RC Paris and Valenciennes.

Club career 
Albert Toris played 59 games en Division 1 : 33 with Valenciennes, 12 with RC Paris et 14 with AS Monaco.

References 

1925 births
2022 deaths
Stade Brestois 29 managers
French football managers
Valenciennes FC players
ES Troyes AC players
Racing Club de France Football players
AS Monaco FC players
CA Paris-Charenton players
Angoulême Charente FC players
Footballers from Lille
FootballDatabase.eu template using Wikidata